The Knob Lake and Timmins Railway is an industrial railway owned by Genesee & Wyoming. It interchanges with Tshiuetin Rail Transportation in Schefferville.

References
 Genesee & Wyoming Inc. and Labrador Iron Mines Holdings Limited Sign Rail Services Agreement

External links
Knob Lake and Timmins Railway official webpage - Genesee and Wyoming website

Quebec railways
Newfoundland and Labrador railways
Genesee & Wyoming
Companies based in Quebec
Trois-Rivières
Transport companies established in 2015
2015 establishments in Quebec